A knife bayonet is a knife which can be used both as a bayonet, combat knife, or utility knife. The knife bayonet became the almost universal form of bayonet in the 20th century due to its versatility and effectiveness. Spike bayonets proved useless when separated from the rifle and useless in trench warfare; and while versatile, sword bayonets proved to be impractical weapons in trench warfare because of their length. The first knife bayonet to see widespread service was the 10 inch (25.4 cm) blade Seitengewehr 1871/84, which became the standard German infantry bayonet in 1884. Its derivative, the Seitengewehr 1884/98, would go on in use until 1945 in German service.

The knife bayonets are basically fighting knives or utility knives with a lug and/or muzzle ring to attach to the barrel of a firearm such as an assault rifle or submachine gun. Almost all bayonets today are knife bayonets that are designed for use in hand-to-hand fighting and as utility knives. Some have serrated (saw-blade) back edges for utility and be usable as wire cutters (when used in conjunction with fittings on the sheath).

Modern knife bayonets have 6 inch (15.24 cm) to 8 inch (20.3 cm) long and .75 (1.905 cm) inch to 1.5 (3.81 cm) inch wide blades, and are often fullered. They have been tempered for durability so as not to break when twisting; this was often the problem with long and slender spike bayonets. Like sword bayonets, they can be used not only for thrusting, but also for cutting.

External links
World Bayonets
Bayonet Terminology Diagrams

 Knife bayonet
Blade weapons

de:Bajonett